Lahneh is a village in Gilvan Rural District, in the Central District of Tarom County, Zanjan Province, Iran. At the 2006 census, its population was 22, in 8 families.

References 

Populated places in Tarom County